EDRM is a four-letter initialism that can stand for:
 Electronic Discovery Reference Model
 Enterprise Digital Rights Management - a part of the security policy of Electronic Document and Records Management, however this is a secondary and much newer term and is infrequently used outside the United States
 Electronic Document and Records Management - also known as EDRMS